Taking Care, also known as Prescriptions for Murder, is a Canadian drama film, directed by Clarke Mackey and released in 1987. Loosely based on the real-life case of Susan Nelles, the film stars Janet Amos as Marie, a maternity ward nurse who is accused of murder after three women die in childbirth under her care, and Kate Lynch as Angie O'Connell, her colleague who attempts to collect evidence to prove Marie's innocence.

The cast also includes Saul Rubinek, Barry Flatman, Jackie Richardson, Allan Royal and Ron White.

The film premiered at the 1987 Toronto International Film Festival.

Lynch received a Genie Award nomination for Best Actress at the 9th Genie Awards in 1988.

References

External links 
 

1987 films
Canadian drama films
English-language Canadian films
1980s English-language films
1980s Canadian films